Chennai Madurai Duronto Express is a Duronto Express belonging to Indian Railways which is operated fully Air-Conditioned Superfast Bi-weekly train connecting Chennai and Madurai via Salem in Southern Railway zone. This train will be cancelled with effect from 10 June 2020.

This Duronto Express now converted to a Chennai Central–Madurai AC Superfast Express. It runs three days a week along with the Chennai Central–Madurai AC Superfast Express (20601 / 20602) which runs once a week.

Background
The ever-growing inflow to the State Capital from Madurai and its neighboring districts and the heavy rail traffic on the Tambaram-Villupuram-Madurai section, is the prime reason behind operating the train from Chennai Central. And hence the fact that it takes a longer route via Salem, Namakkal, Karur, Dindugal. The train makes only one commercial halt at Salem Junction across the Chennai-Salem-Madurai line. It is now running with LHB rakes (Linke Hoffman Busch) from 26 JUNE 2018 and is maintained at Chennai Central.

Coach Composition 

The train consists of one 1 AC First/Executive Class (1A), 2 AC Two-tier (2A), 9 AC Three-Tier (3A) and 2 EOG.

Gallery

See also
Pandian Express
Vaigai Express
 Duronto Express
 List of named passenger trains of India

Notes

References

Transport in Chennai
Transport in Madurai
Duronto Express trains
Rail transport in Tamil Nadu